The history of the kisaeng covers the entire second millennium from the Goryeo dynasty to modern South Korea.  The kisaeng system first emerged in the early Goryeo period and was at its height in the middle Joseon Dynasty.  The kisaeng contributed to the entertainment of others such as the Yangbans and kings. Some kisaeng also held positions of importance in the court and in the literary culture. 

A strange silence hangs over the official history of Korea when it comes to the kisaeng.  They enter only occasionally into official records such as the Goryeosa or Joseon Wangjo Sillok.  Yet references to kisaeng are quite widespread in the "anecdotal histories" of later Joseon and Silhak thinkers such as Yi Ik and Dasan where they gave some thought to their role and station in society.  Even today, many formal histories of Korea pay very little or no heed to the story of the kisaeng.  For example, Ki-baek Lee's New History of Korea does not contain a single reference to the kisaeng.

Origins

There are various theories concerning the origin of the kisaeng.  The first such theory was formulated by the scholar Dasan and theories have multiplied as the kisaeng themselves have receded into the past.

One theory actually places their origins in the Silla dynasty, among the wonhwa, female predecessors of the hwarang.  However, there is little to suggest a concrete link between Silla's wonhwa and the later kisaeng.  Also, the wonhwa seem to have been chosen from among the aristocracy, whereas kisaeng were always members of the lower classes.  For these reasons, few contemporary scholars support this theory.

Many others trace their origins to the early years of Goryeo, when many people were displaced following the end of the Later Three Kingdoms period in 936.  At this time, a large number of Baekje people wandered the country.  It is not clear whether this nomadic lifestyle was already established, or a consequence of the recent turmoil.  In fact, a connection between these wanderers and the nomadic tribes of Manchuria has been conjectured.  The first king of Goryeo, Taejo, considered these wanderers to be a threat to the stability of the state.  He ordered that they be made into slaves of the government.   Although no records exist, it is likely that the first kisaeng were drawn from these wanderers.

Goryeo

Regardless of their origins, the kisaeng first emerged as a class and rose to prominence during the Goryeo Dynasty, 935–1394.  They are first mentioned in the early 11th century. At this time, they were primarily engaged in skilled trades such as needlework, music, and medicine.  The female entertainers of the court during this period filled a role similar to that later filled by almost all kisaeng. 

Due to the growth of the kisaeng class, during the reign of Myeongjong, the state began to keep records (called gijeok) of the kisaeng living in each jurisdiction.  Around this time, the state also made efforts to set up educational institutions to train kisaeng entertainers.  These academies were known as gyobang and first appear in history with their abolition by King Hyeonjong in 1010. However, they were re-established in the reign of Chungnyeol.  The gyobang provided training in the dangak and sogak musical styles.

The women trained in the gyobang were exclusively court entertainers.  Their role in the affairs of the court became increasingly important as the dynasty progressed.  They entertained both the king and visiting dignitaries, a role which continued into the Joseon period.  In addition, beginning in the reign of Munjong, they performed at official ceremonies of the state.

Just as the origin of the kisaeng is unclear, so is their precise relation to other strata of society.  The female entertainers who appear in records are exclusively kisaeng of the court and are recorded as slaves of the government.

Joseon

Goryeo was succeeded by the Joseon Dynasty, 1394–1910.  During the Joseon dynasty, the kisaeng system continued to flourish and develop, despite the government's deeply ambivalent attitude toward it.

Joseon was founded on Neo-Confucian ideals and the Neo-Confucian scholars of the time took a very dim view of professional women and of the kisaeng class.  There were many calls for the abolition of the kisaeng and for their exclusion from court, but these calls were not successful, perhaps because of the influence of the women themselves or perhaps because of fear that officials would take to stealing the wives of other men. 

One such proposal was made during the reign of Sejong, but when an advisor of the court suggested that the abolition of the class would lead to government officials committing grave crimes, the king chose to preserve the kisaeng.

During the brief and violent reign of Yeonsan-gun, 1494–1506, kisaeng became symbolic of royal excess.  Yeonsan-gun treated women as primarily objects of pleasure and made even the medicinal women into entertainers (yakbang gisaeng).  Yeonsan-gun brought 1,000 women and girls from the provinces to serve as palace kisaeng; many of them were paid from the public treasury.  Yeonsan-gun may have been the first to institute a formal hierarchy among them, dividing the kisaeng of the  palace into "Heaven," those with whom he slept, and "Earth," those who served other functions.

In 1650, all kisaeng were made slaves of the government.  The kisaeng who were attached to a government office were known as gwan-gi, or "kisaeng of the office."   Their role, did not by law, include sexual service to the officeholder; in fact, government officials could be severely punished for consorting with a kisaeng. However, in practice, kisaeng were often forced to serve the officeholder.  A distinction was sometimes made between those gwan-gi who were obliged to sleep with the officeholder and those who were not.  This distinction was featured in the popular play Chunhyangga.

The Gabo Reform of 1895 officially abolished the class system of Joseon along with slavery.  From 1895 moving forward, all kisaeng became nominally free.  In practice, many kisaeng like many other slaves, continued in servitude for years.  In addition, many of those who were freed had no alternative career; they continued as entertainers without the protections afforded by the kisaeng status.  During the subsequent decades, many of these kisaeng went to Japan to work.

Notes

 Remarked upon by Ahn (2000b), p. 79.
 Specifically during the reigns of Hyeonjong and Munjong (Hwang 1997, p. 450).
 This was asserted by Yi Neung-hwa, author of the first history of the kisaeng (Hwang 1997, p. 449).
 Hwang 1997, loc. cit.
 The Silhak scholar Dasan traced the origin of the class to Myeongjong's creation of the gijeok, but most contemporary scholars believe that the class had already emerged earlier in the dynasty (Hwang 1997, p. 450).
 Kim (1976), p. 54.
 Song (1999), p. 35.
 Kim (1976), pp. 54–55.
 Kim (1976), p. 55.
 Kim (1976), p. 139.
 Hwang (1997), p. 450.  The advisor was Heo Jong.
 Kim (1976), p. 138.
 Kim (1976), p. 139.
 Hwang (1997), p. 451.
 Breen (2004), p. 88.
 So asserted by Ahn (2000a), p. 94.
 Hwang (1997), p. 452.  According to Hwang, he terms used were 겉수청, or "surface government servants," and 살수청, or "flesh government servants."
 Hwang (1997).  However, according to Ahn (2000a, p. 298), Chunhyang could refuse the magistrate's advances because her body-price had already been paid and her name had been removed from the gijeok, meaning she was no longer a kisaeng.
 Mentioned in a U.S. News & World Report article of 1999, quoted here:  .

References
  (In two volumes).

 (Tr. from Japanese original)
Kim, Dong-uk.  (1963).  Women's literary achievements (Yi Dynasty).  Korea Journal 3(11), 33–36.  

McCann, David.  (1977).  Traditional world of kisaeng.  Korea Journal 14(2), 40–43.

See also
History of Korea
History of sexuality

History of Korea by topic
Joseon dynasty